South Fork is an unincorporated community and census-designated place (CDP) in Howell County, Missouri, United States. As of the 2010 census, South Fork had a population of 241.

A post office called South Fork was established in 1860, and remained in operation until 1960. The community was named after the nearby South Fork of the Spring River.

Demographics

References

Census-designated places in Howell County, Missouri
Census-designated places in Missouri